VSI Tampa Bay FC was an American soccer team based in Plant City, Florida. They played in USL Pro, the third tier of the American soccer pyramid, in the 2013 season. VSI Tampa Bay FC were owned by VisionPro Sports Institute and were affiliated with a women's team in the W-League, an amateur team in the USL Premier Development League (PDL), and a youth team in the Super-20 League. All the teams folded in 2013.

History
In 2011, English soccer development academy VisionPro Sports Institute announced a venture to establish a soccer organization in the United Soccer Leagues in the United States. VSI partnered with the local Brandon, Florida area youth soccer organization, West Florida Flames, to build VSI Tampa Flames, "the perfect platform for vertical progression, giving talented youngsters the opportunity to progress from junior soccer all the way through to the professional game," according to VSI's CEO, Simon Crane. The USL Pro team was to serve as the pinnacle of the youth pyramid for men; the club also included a women's team in the W-League, an amateur team in the USL Premier Development League (PDL), and a youth team in the Super-20 League. The W-League, PDL, and Super-20 League teams started play in 2012, while the USL Pro team was to join in 2013. On November 22, 2012, the team changed its name to "VSI Tampa Bay FC" and named Matt Weston as the head coach.

Their first game was played on March 30, 2013, losing to Phoenix FC 1–0. They defeated the Los Angeles Blues 1-0 for their first win on April 2, 2013. Antonio Neto scored the first goal in team history.

VSI Tampa Bay chose Plant City Stadium as their home venue on April 4, 2013, moving all the teams there. Matt Weston resigned as Head Coach on May 8, 2013, and Joel Harrison was named as Interim Head Coach.

While the W-League and PDL teams had been successful in 2012, the USL Pro team struggled throughout its only season. The remote stadium in Plant City made it difficult to attract fans, and the team suffered from competition from the more successful Tampa Bay Rowdies of the North American Soccer League. The organization folded all of its teams after the 2013 season.

Final roster

Staff
  Joel Harrison - Head Coach
  Sheldon Cipriani - Head Coach, PDL Team / First Team Assistant Coach
  Sam Mitchell - Head Coach, Super-20 League Team / First Team Assistant Coach
  Jorge Zavala - Goalkeeping Coach / First Team Assistant Coach
  Mac McCarthy - Performance Coach
  John Mitchell - Head of Operations
  Clay Roberts - Director of Soccer

Team Records

Year-by-Year

Head coaches

 Includes USL Regular season, USL Play-offs and U.S. Lamar Hunt Open Cup

See also
VSI Tampa Bay FC (PDL)
VSI Tampa Bay FC (W-League)

References

External links
Official Website

Soccer clubs in Tampa, Florida
2011 establishments in Florida
Former USL Championship teams
Association football clubs established in 2011
2013 disestablishments in Florida
Association football clubs disestablished in 2013
Defunct soccer clubs in Florida
Sports in Hillsborough County, Florida
Plant City, Florida